Maison et Objet is a major French trade fair for interior design. Held bi-annually in Paris Nord Villepinte Exhibition Center, it has been described as "among the 3 most important European events for interior design ... a huge collection of innovation and talent all in one place."

Maison et Objet in Beijing
"M&O Design Pavilion at WF CENTRAL" was a collaboration between Maison et Objet and WF Central, a luxury retail mall in Wangfujing, Beijing. The exhibition lasted from 16 September to 18 November 2018. The special exhibition, which marks the initial entry of M&O to the China consumer market, followed the theme LOVE DESIGN and feature over 30 selected brands and six M&O Designers of the Year.

Designer of the Year
Every year the fair bestows a designer or multiple designers with its "Designer of the Year Award".  The honorees as of present have been:
 2012 - Tokujin Yoshioka
 2013 - Edward Barber & Jay Oosgerby, Odile Decq and Joseph Dirand
 2014 - Dimore Studio, Tom Dixon, and Phillip Nigro 
 2015 - Dorothée Meilichzon and Nendo (Sato Oki)
 2016 - Ilse Crawford and Eugeni Quillet
 2017 - Tristan Auer, Pierre Charpin, and WOHA AND Rising Asian Talents
 2018 - Cecilie Manz; Ramy Fischler 
 2019 - Sebastian Herkner
 2023 - Raphael Navot

References

Trade fairs in France
Interior design